The list of ship decommissionings in 1884 includes a chronological list of all ships decommissioned in 1884.


References

See also 

1884
 Ship decommissionings